Myanmar is divided into twenty-one administrative subdivisions, which include 7 regions, 7 states, 1 union territory, 1 self-administered division, and 5 self-administered zones. Following is the table of government subdivisions and its organizational structure based on different regions, states, the union territory, the self-administered division, and the self-administered zones:

The regions were called divisions prior to August 2010, and four of them are named after their capital city, the exceptions being Sagaing Region, Ayeyarwady Region and Tanintharyi Region. The regions can be described as ethnically predominantly Burman (Bamar), while the states, the zones and Wa Division are dominated by ethnic minorities.

Yangon Region has the largest population and is the most densely populated. The smallest population is Kayah State. In terms of land area, Shan State is the largest and Naypyidaw Union Territory is the smallest.

Regions and states are divided into districts (kha yaing or khayaing). These districts consist of townships (myo-ne) that include towns (myo), wards (yatkwet)) and village tracts (kyayywa oksu). Village tracts are groups of adjacent villages (kyayywa).

Structural hierarchy

Some townships are divided into Subtownships, which are semi-official parts of a township administered separately. Many reports will use subtownships, especially more established subtownships used by the main townships themselves.

Administrative divisions

Regions, States and Union Territory

Self-Administered Division and Self-Administered Zones

System of administration

The administrative structure of the states, regions and self-administering bodies is outlined in the new constitution adopted in 2008.

Regions and States 
Executive authority is held in each state or region by a Regional or State Government consisting of a Chief Minister, other ministers and an Advocate General. The President appoints the Chief Minister from a list of qualified candidates in the regional or state legislature; the regional or state legislature must approve the President's choice unless they can prove that he or she does not meet the constitutional qualifications.

Legislative authority resides with the State Hluttaw or Regional Hluttaw made up of elected civilian members and representatives of the Armed Forces. Both divisions are considered equivalent, the only distinction being that states have large ethnic minority populations and regions are mostly populated by the national majority Burmans / Bamar.

Naypyidaw Union Territory 

The constitution states that Naypyidaw shall be a Union Territory under the direct administration of the President. Day-to-day functions would be carried out on the President's behalf by the Naypyidaw Council led by a Chairperson. The Chairperson and members of the Naypyidaw Council are appointed by the President and shall include civilians and representatives of the Armed Forces.

Self-Administered Division and Self-Administered Zones 
Self-Administered Zones and Self-Administered Divisions are administered by a Leading Body. The Leading Body consists of at least ten members and includes State or Regional Hluttaw members elected from the Zones or Divisions and other members nominated by the Armed Forces. The Leading Body has both executive and legislative powers. A Chairperson is head of each Leading Body.

Within Sagaing Region:

 Naga (Leshi, Lahe, and Namyun townships)

Within Shan State:

 Danu Self-Administered Zone (Ywangan and Pindaya townships),
 Kokang Self-Administered Zone (Konkyan and Laukkai townships)
 Pa Laung Self-Administered Zone (Namshan and Manton townships)
 Pa'O Self-Administered Zone (Hopong, Hshihseng, and Pinlaung townships),
 Wa Self-Administered Division (Hopang, Mongmao, Panwai, Pangsang, Naphan, and Metman townships)

Districts and Townships 
Districts are the second-order divisions of Myanmar and are often named after a population center within the district of the same name. Shan State has the most districts, even excluding Self-Administered Zones and Divisions. Naypyidaw Union Territory and Mon State have the least with just 2 districts. The District's role is more supervisory as the 330 townships are the basic administrative unit of local governance and are the only type of administrative division that covers the entirety of Myanmar. A District is led by a District Administrator and a Township is administered by a Township Administrator. Both are appointed civil servants through the General Administration Department (GAD) of the Ministry of Home Affairs (MOHA). The Minister of Home Affairs is to be appointed by the military according to the 2008 constitution. 

Most local governance services are offered at the Township level; few services are offered at the District level. The Township Administrator is the key focal point for most interactions with the government and the Township Administrator serves as a representative of the State or Region government and executes functions on behalf of the State or Region. All Township governments are staffed by 34 GAD civil servants regardless of population, although larger townships may have several Township committees that coordinate with the Township and report to the District. Subtownships exist for many but not all townships. They can be created for many reasons including, townships with large areas, townships with a large natural barrier or townships with a lopsided population distribution. These subtownships are unofficial, but can be used by the Township administration and national ministries for data collection and administrative ease.

Wards, Village Tracts and Municipalities 
The fourth and lowest level of administration is the ward for urban areas and village tract for rural areas. Some townships include areas not part of any ward or village tract. Village Tracts may contain up to 8 distinct villages. Most townships contain at least one ward/town, and are usually named after the population center. As of reforms in 2012 and 2013, Ward and Village Tract administrators are now typically elected, but report to the appointed Township Administrator. Ward Administrators and Village Tract Administrators (also called just Village Administrators) are supported by 100-household-heads and 10-household-heads who are collectively called area leaders. 

Most cities in Myanmar are contained within one township like Pathein. In some cases, the rural portions of the township may be administered semi-independently as sub-townships. In larger cities, like Mandalay, the municipality may be functionally administered at a district level with townships acting de facto as subdivisions of a city. In Yangon, the administrative jurisdiction of the Yangon City Development Committee overlap across 33 townships and all 4 of Yangon Region's districts.

History

British colonisation
In 1900, Burma was a province of British India, and was divided into two subdivisions: Lower Burma, whose capital was Rangoon with four divisions (Arakan, Irrawaddy, Pegu, Tenasserim), and Upper Burma, whose capital was Mandalay with six divisions (Meiktila, Minbu, Sagaing, North Federated Shan States and South Federated Shan States).

On 10 October 1922, the Karenni States of Bawlake, Kantarawaddy, and Kyebogyi became a part of the Federated Shan States. In 1940, Minbu division's name was changed to Magwe, and Meiktila Divisions became part of Mandalay District.

Post-independence
Upon independence, on 4 January 1948, the Chin Hills area was split from Arakan Division to form Chin Special Division, and Kachin State was formed by carving out the Myitkyina and Bhamo districts of Mandalay Division. Karen State was also created from Amherst, Thaton, and Toungoo Districts of Tenasserim Division. Karenni State was separated from the Federated Shan States, and Shan State was formed by merging the Federated Shan States and the Wa States.

In 1952, Karenni State was renamed Kayah State. In 1964, Rangoon Division was separated from Pegu Division, whose capital shifted to Pegu. In addition, Karen State was renamed Kawthoolei State.

In 1972, the Hanthawaddy and Hmawbi districts were moved under Rangoon Division's juridstiction.

In 1974, after Ne Win introduced a constitution, Chin Special Division became a state, and its capital moved from Falam to Hakha. Kawthoolei State's name was reverted to Karen State. Mon State was created out of portions of Tenasserim Division and Pegu Division. Mon State's capital became Moulmein, and Tenasserim Division's became Tavoy. In addition, Rakhine Division was granted statehood.

In 1989, after the coup d'état by the military junta, the names of many divisions in Burma were altered in English to reflect Burmese pronunciations.

After 1995, in Kachin State Mohnyin District was created out of Myitkyina District as part of the peace agreement with the Kachin Independence Army.

2008 Constitution
The 2008 Constitution stipulates the renaming of the 7 "divisions" ( in Burmese) as "regions" ( in Burmese). It also stipulates the creation of Union territories, which include the capital of Nay Pyi Taw and ethnic self-administered zones ( in Burmese) and self-administered divisions ( in Burmese). These self-administered regions include the following:

 Danu Self-Administered Zone: consisting of Ywangan and Pindaya townships in Shan State
 Kokang Self-Administered Zone: consisting of Konkyan and Laukkai townships in Shan State
 Naga Self-Administered Zone: consisting of Leshi, Lahe, and Namyun townships in Sagaing Region
 Pa Laung Self-Administered Zone: consisting of Namhsan and Manton townships in Shan State
 Pa-O Self-Administered Zone: consisting of Hopong, Hsihseng, and Pinlaung townships in Shan State
 Wa Self-Administered Division: consisting of Hopang, Mongmao, Panwai, Nahpan, Metman, and Pangsang (Pankham) townships in Shan State

On 20 August 2010, the renaming of the 7 divisions and the naming of the 6 self-administered zones was announced by Burmese state media.

See also

 List of administrative divisions of Myanmar by Human Development Index
 Districts of Myanmar
 List of cities and largest towns in Myanmar
 State and Region Government of Myanmar
 List of Burmese flags
 ISO 3166-2:MM

References

External links
 Statoids

Lists of subdivisions of Myanmar
Myanmar